Gary Day is an American politician representing the 187th Legislative District of Pennsylvania. His district includes communities of northern, northwestern, and west-central Lehigh County and northeastern Berks County.

Career
Prior to being elected to the Pennsylvania General Assembly, Day was the director of marketing and human resources for Service Electric Cablevision. He served as executive assistant to Republican Allentown mayor William Heydt from 1994 to 2001. He has also served as a member of the YMCA board of directors, founding member of the Lehigh Valley Sportsfest, executive director of the Allentown Advancement Team, and executive committee member of the Allentown Economic Development Corporation.

Personal
Day holds a bachelor's degree in economics with a minor in business from Penn State University. He and his wife have three children and are members of the Saint Joseph the Worker Church. They reside in Lehigh County.

References

Year of birth missing (living people)
Living people
Republican Party members of the Pennsylvania House of Representatives
Pennsylvania State University alumni
People from Lehigh County, Pennsylvania
21st-century American politicians